New York City's 45th City Council district is one of 51 districts in the New York City Council. It has been represented by Democrat Farah Louis since a 2019 special election to replace fellow Democrat Jumaane Williams.

Geography 
District 45 is based in East Flatbush and Flatlands in Brooklyn, also covering parts of Flatbush, Midwood, Marine Park, and Kensington.

The district overlaps with Brooklyn Community Boards 12, 14, 15, 17, and 18, and with New York's 8th and 9th congressional districts. It also overlaps with the 17th, 19th, 21st, and 22nd districts of the New York State Senate, and with the 41st, 42nd, 44th, 48th, 58th, and 59th districts of the New York State Assembly.

Recent election results

2021 
In 2019, voters in New York City approved Ballot Question 1, which implemented ranked-choice voting in all local elections. Under the new system, voters have the option to rank up to five candidates for every local office. Voters whose first-choice candidates fare poorly will have their votes redistributed to other candidates in their ranking until one candidate surpasses the 50 percent threshold. If one candidate surpasses 50 percent in first-choice votes, then ranked-choice tabulations will not occur.

2019 special 
In 2019, Councilman Jumaane Williams was elected New York City Public Advocate, leaving his seat vacant. Two special elections were scheduled to fill his seat: one nonpartisan election in May, followed by a standard partisan primary and general election that June and September. Both were won by Farah Louis.

2017

2013

References 

New York City Council districts